Husseren-les-Châteaux is a commune in the Haut-Rhin department in Grand Est in north-eastern France. The village lies on the edge of the Ballons des Vosges Nature Park, where the Vosges meet the Upper Rhine Plain.

The village is overlooked by the ruins of three castles which stand in close proximity to each other: Dagsbourg, Wahlenbourg and Weckmund. They are known locally as Les Trois Châteaux. Although the ruins can be reached by car they are a popular hiking destination.

This village is one of the many villages along 'La Route des Vins d'Alsace', close to Eguisheim and is in the middle of vineyards. The village is connected to Eguisheim by the Route du Vin (D14).

See also
 Communes of the Haut-Rhin department

References

Communes of Haut-Rhin
Enclaves and exclaves